Ocalaria is a genus of moths of the family Erebidae. The genus was described by Schaus in 1906.

Species
Ocalaria cohabita Kitching, 1988 Panama
Ocalaria dioptica (Walker, 1865) Brazil (Amazonas), Bolivia, French Guiana
Ocalaria guarana Schaus, 1906 Brazil (São Paulo)
Ocalaria oculata (Druce, 1898) Guatemala
Ocalaria pavina Schaus, 1916 Brazil (Rio de Janeiro)
Ocalaria pavo Schaus, 1913 Costa Rica
Ocalaria quadriocellata (Walker, 1865) Brazil (Rio de Janeiro)

References

Calpinae